Pedro Mairata Gual (born 15 January 1979) is a Spanish former professional footballer who played as a central defender.

Club career
Mairata was born in Manacor, Balearic Islands. Until the age of 26, he played in the Segunda División B or lower, representing local CE Constància, UD Las Palmas Atlético and Atlético Levante UD. In 2005, he signed for Basque club SD Eibar, being regularly used but suffering relegation from Segunda División; even though the team produced the ninth-best defensive record in the league (45 goals in 42 matches), they finished last.

After one year with UD Almería in the second tier, contributing 15 matches to the Andalusia side's first-ever promotion to La Liga, Mairata joined Gimnàstic de Tarragona of the same league. After six seasons at the Nou Estadi de Tarragona, five of those in the second division, he was released.

References

External links

1979 births
Living people
Sportspeople from Manacor
Spanish footballers
Footballers from Mallorca
Association football defenders
Segunda División players
Segunda División B players
Tercera División players
CE Constància players
UD Las Palmas Atlético players
Atlético Levante UD players
SD Eibar footballers
UD Almería players
Gimnàstic de Tarragona footballers
CD Atlético Baleares footballers
CD Llosetense players